This is a list of automobile Assembly Plants in Ontario, Canada.  Ontario produces more vehicles than any other jurisdiction in North America, with six of the world's top manufacturers operating assembly plants in Windsor, Brampton, Oakville, Alliston, Woodstock, Cambridge, Ingersoll, Oshawa, Bolton.

Arash Motor Manufacturing North-America Inc.

General Motors Company

Ford Motor Company

Stellantis

Toyota Motor Corporation

Honda Motor Company

See also
Automotive industry in Canada

External links
 Ontario's Auto Industry: Driving the Future
 Canadian Auto Manufacturers

Motor vehicle assembly plants in Canada
Automobiles